Caroline Casey (born 20 October 1971) is an Irish activist and management consultant. She is legally blind due to ocular albinism.  In 2000, aged 28, she left her job in Accenture to launch the Aisling Foundation, with an aim to improve how disability is treated. In 2001, she trekked across India, solo, on elephant back for c.1,000 km, raising €250k for The National Council for the Blind of Ireland and Sightsavers. Casey became the first female mahout from the west. The journey was the subject of a National Geographic documentary Elephant Vision and a TED Talk.

Background
Casey was diagnosed with ocular albinism as a child but was not personally informed until her 17th birthday. She graduated from University College Dublin with BA, DBS and MBS degrees. She worked at a couple of jobs including as a management consultant for Accenture.

Aisling Foundation/Kanchi
The Ability Awards, styled as the O2 Ability Awards for sponsorship reasons, were set up by the foundation in 2005 to recognise organisations that promote disability inclusion. In 2011, the Telefónica Ability Awards were launched in Spain, with further versions planned for other countries in Europe. In 2008 the foundation was renamed in honour of the elephant "Kanchi" used on the Indian expedition.

The Valuable 500
Casey founded The Valuable 500, an organisation that aims to get disability on the leadership agenda.

Recognition
 Henry Viscardi Achievement Awards 2020
 Rehab Young Person of the Year (joint), 2002 (joint)
 JCI Ten Outstanding Young Persons of the World, 2002
 Ashoka Fellow, 2006
 WEF Young Global Leaders, 2006
 Honorary Doctor of Laws, University College Dublin, 2006
 Eisenhower Scholarship, 2007
 Speaker at:
 Global Competitiveness Forum, Riyadh
 Clinton Global Initiative, New York City
 TEDWomen

Affiliations

 Board member of 98FM
 Board member of Sightsavers
 Former board member of Comhairle/Citizens Information Board (2002-?)
 Former board member of Jack and Jill Children's Foundation
 Former board member of FÁS (2001-?)
 Former board member of Irish Charity Tax Reform Group/Charities Institute Ireland

References

External links
 Kanchi Foundation official website
 

1971 births
Blind activists
Irish blind people
21st-century Irish women
Living people
People with albinism
Place of birth missing (living people)
Year of birth uncertain 
Alumni of University College Dublin
21st-century Irish businesspeople
Ashoka Fellows